Whitecap Resources is a Canadian public oil company based in Calgary, Alberta, with operations in Alberta, Saskatchewan, and British Columbia.  In 2018, it produced 74,415 barrels of energy per day, with 85% of production consisting of crude oil and other liquids.  It is listed on the Toronto Stock Exchange.

History 
Whitecap Resources was founded in 2009.  Its daily production grew rapidly in the following years, from 275 barrels of energy per day in 2009 to 14,052 in 2012.  In 2012, it acquired Midway Energy, another Alberta light oil producer, for $550 million.  In 2016, Whitecap bought some of  Husky Energy's oil assets in Southwest Saskatchewan for $595 million. 

In 2017, Brad Wall, then-premier of Saskatchewan, invited Whitecap to move to that province, citing lower taxes and subsidized relocation costs.  The company CEO, Grant Fagerheim, said that it was considering the offer, but would only move if it benefited shareholders.

In November 2017, Whitecap purchased a 62% interest in the Weyburn oil project in Saskatchewan for $940 million from Cenovus Energy.  The deal was expected to increase Whitecap's oil production by 25%.

Operations 

Whitecap Resources primarily produces light, sweet crude oil, as opposed to heavy oil or natural gas.  It generally focuses on oil development and production instead of exploration.  It has properties in northwest Alberta & B.C., central Alberta, and Saskatchewan with 2019 production guidance of 70,000 - 72,000 barrels of energy per day.  As of 2019, Whitecap has identified 2,827 gross drilling locations (8 to 10 years of inventory) with 1,568 proved plus probable.

Whitecap's strategy is to deliver 10% to 15%/annum dividend + growth through balance sheet strength, sustainable dividends and moderate growth.

Carbon sequestration 

Whitecap's  Weyburn-Midale Carbon Dioxide Project, transports emissions from a North Dakota coal power plant and a coal gasification facility to the Weyburn oilfields located south of Regina oilfield in region south of Regina, Saskatchewan. According to a January 25, 2021 CBC News article, the Whitecap project is very similar but much larger than the Enhance Energy project that is part of the Alberta Carbon Trunk Line System.

In November 2017, Whitecap purchased a 62% interest in the Weyburn oil project in Saskatchewan for $940 million from Cenovus Energy.  The deal was expected to increase Whitecap's oil production by 25%.

According to a 2008 article in Canadian Geographic Magazine, at that time the Weyburn carbon monitoring and storage project was the world's largest carbon capture and storage project.

References 

Companies listed on the Toronto Stock Exchange
Companies based in Calgary
Oil companies of Canada